Drue  J. Vitter (July 21, 1942 – October 8, 2004) was an American politician who served in the South Dakota Senate from 1997 until his death in 2004. He died at the age of 62 in at his home in Hill City, South Dakota.

References

External links

1942 births
2004 deaths
Republican Party South Dakota state senators
People from Hill City, South Dakota
20th-century American politicians